Filose can refer to a few things:

Filose, describing members of the Filosa subphylum of Cercozoa organisms
Filose, describing something with thread-like projections